The 1983 New Zealand Royal Visit Honours was an appointment by Elizabeth II to the Queen's Service Order, to mark the visit of the Prince and Princess of Wales to New Zealand in April that year, and was dated 20 April 1983.

Companion of the Queen's Service Order (QSO)
Extra Companion, for public services
 His Royal Highness The Prince Charles Philip Arthur George, Prince of Wales

References

1983 awards
Royal Visit Honours
Monarchy in New Zealand